Taylor Jane Schilling (born July 27, 1984) is an American actress. She is known for her role as Piper Chapman on the Netflix original comedy-drama series Orange Is the New Black (2013–2019), for which she received a nomination for the Primetime Emmy Award for Outstanding Lead Actress in a Comedy Series and two Golden Globe Award nominations for Best Actress – Television Series Musical or Comedy and Best Actress – Television Series Drama. She made her film debut in the 2007 drama Dark Matter. She also starred as Nurse Veronica Flanagan Callahan in the short-lived NBC medical drama Mercy (2009–2010). Her other films include Atlas Shrugged: Part I (2011), the romantic drama The Lucky One (2012), the comedy Take Me (2017), and the science-fiction thriller The Titan (2018).

Early life and education
Schilling was born July 27, 1984, in Boston, Massachusetts, the daughter of Patricia (née Miller), an MIT administrator, and Robert J. Schilling, a former prosecutor. She grew up in West Roxbury and Wayland, dividing her time between her divorced parents. A fan of the NBC medical drama ER in her youth, she began acting at a young age. She became active in her middle school's theatre program when she appeared in their production of Fiddler on the Roof.

After graduating from Wayland High School in 2002, Schilling attended Fordham University's campus at Lincoln Center, where she continued to take part in stage productions while earning her Bachelor of Fine Arts in 2006. She entered the graduate acting program at New York University's Tisch School of the Arts to continue her acting studies, but left after her second year. While attempting to break into acting, she supported herself by working as a nanny for a Manhattan-based family.

Career
Schilling won the Emerson College Playwright's Festival Outstanding Performance Award. She made her feature-film debut with a supporting role in the independent film Dark Matter (2007). In 2009, she starred in the NBC medical drama Mercy as a tough Iraq War veteran and former military nurse-turned-medical practitioner. When she read for the part via videotape from New York City, she impressed the show's creator and executive producer, Liz Heldens, who flew her to Los Angeles to audition. Mercy ran for one season, from September 2009 to May 2010.

Schilling portrayed Dagny Taggart in the film Atlas Shrugged: Part I (2011), and co-starred with Zac Efron in the romantic drama film The Lucky One (2012). She starred as Piper Chapman in the Netflix original series Orange Is the New Black, which premiered July 11, 2013. For her work on the show, Schilling was nominated for the Golden Globe Award for Best Actress in a Television Series – Drama and the Primetime Emmy Award for Outstanding Lead Actress in a Comedy Series in 2014. Schilling can be seen as Erica Boyer in the miniseries Pam & Tommy which premiered February 2, 2022.

Personal life
In 2020, Schilling revealed in an Instagram post that she is dating Emily Ritz, a musical and visual artist. Schilling practices Transcendental Meditation.

Filmography

Film

Television

Awards and nominations

See also
 LGBTQ culture in New York City

References

External links

 
 

1984 births
21st-century American actresses
Actresses from Boston
American film actresses
American television actresses
Fordham University alumni
Living people
People from Suffolk County, Massachusetts
People from Wayland, Massachusetts
Tisch School of the Arts alumni
LGBT actresses
LGBT people from Massachusetts
American LGBT actors
American people of German descent
Wayland High School alumni
Sexually fluid women
21st-century American LGBT people